Warwick is a city in Worth County, Georgia, United States. The population was 423 at the 2010 census. It is part of the Albany, Georgia Metropolitan Statistical Area.

Geography
Warwick is located at  (31.830351, -83.920705).

Demographics

2020 census

As of the 2020 United States census, there were 504 people, 215 households, and 132 families residing in the city.

2000 census
As of the census of 2000, there were 430 people, 160 households, and 123 families residing in the city. The racial makeup of the city was 37.67% White, 61.16% African American, 0.47% Asian, 0.47% from other races, and 0.23% from two or more races. Hispanic or Latino of any race were 0.47% of the population.

There were 160 households, out of which 31.3% had children under the age of 18 living with them, 43.8% were married couples living together, 28.1% had a female householder with no husband present, and 23.1% were non-families. 23.1% of all households were made up of individuals, and 12.5% had someone living alone who was 65 years of age or older. The average household size was 2.69 and the average family size was 3.14.

In the city, the population was spread out, with 30.9% under the age of 18, 9.5% from 18 to 24, 20.2% from 25 to 44, 24.2% from 45 to 64, and 15.1% who were 65 years of age or older. The median age was 34 years. For every 100 females, there were 84.5 males. For every 100 females age 18 and over, there were 73.7 males.

The median income for a household in the city was $30,208, and the median income for a family was $37,778. Males had a median income of $26,250 versus $14,125 for females. The per capita income for the city was $12,766. About 18.5% of families and 27.7% of the population were below the poverty line, including 41.5% of those under age 18 and 25.0% of those age 65 or over.

National Grits Festival
The National Grits Festival began around 1999 and took a 4-year hiatus that ended in 2017. At that time, Mayor Juanita Kinchen, city councilors, and local citizens restarted the festival. The first year back from hiatus enjoyed approximately 3,000 attendees. The Grits Festival committee helped fund the expansion of electricity to another portion of the city square and doubled the size of the festival in 2018.

Notable person
Bert J. Harris Jr., Florida state legislator and citrus farmer

References

Cities in Georgia (U.S. state)
Cities in Worth County, Georgia
Albany metropolitan area, Georgia